Ella Gjømle Berg (born May 29, 1979) is a cross-country skier from Stathelle, Bamble, Norway. She competes for Lyn Ski Club, Oslo.

Career 
Gjømle Berg competed in the 2005 World Championship in Oberstdorf, finishing ninth in the sprint competition. She finished fourth in team sprint at the 2006 Olympics in Torino, and finished sixth in the individual sprint.

Gjømle Berg finished second in the 2005/2006 Sprint World Cup.

She obtained one victory (team sprint with Marit Bjørgen, Düsseldorf) and one third place (sprint, Düsseldorf) during the 2006-07 Cross-Country Skiing World Cup.

She is a three times Norwegian champion.

Cross-country skiing results
All results are sourced from the International Ski Federation (FIS).

Olympic Games

World Championships

World Cup

Season standings

Individual podiums
1 victory 
7 podiums

Team podiums

 4 victories – (1 , 3 ) 
 5 podiums – (1 , 4 )

References

External links

1979 births
Living people
People from Bamble
Norwegian female cross-country skiers
Olympic cross-country skiers of Norway
Cross-country skiers at the 2006 Winter Olympics
Sportspeople from Vestfold og Telemark